Cydia anaranjada, the slash pine seedworm moth, is a moth of the family Tortricidae. It is found in southeastern North America.

The wingspan is about 16 mm.

The caterpillars (slash pine seedworms) feed on the seeds of Pinus elliottii.

Grapholitini
Moths described in 1959